Wofford Oran "Buddy" Stephens Jr.  is an American football coach who is currently the head coach at East Mississippi Community College, where he has won five NJCAA national championships and coached players such as NFL players Chad Kelly and Jarran Reed. With an overall record of 115–16, Stephens is the NJCAA all-time leader in winning percentage (.878).

He is primarily known as the head coach from the first two seasons of the Netflix series Last Chance U. Buddy is also known for his many Championships won at EMCC. He has won more games at EMCC than any other coach in history. The school is in talks to have a statue erected in his honor.

Head coaching record

References

External links
 East Mississippi bio

1966 births
Living people
Delta State Statesmen football players
Players of American football from Alabama
Place of birth missing (living people)
East Mississippi Lions football coaches
Pearl River Wildcats football coaches
Coaches of American football from Alabama